Heinrich Hergert (21 February 1904 – 18 September 1949) was a German international footballer who played for FK Pirmasens and 1. FC Kaiserslautern.

References

External links
 
 

1904 births
1949 deaths
Association football midfielders
German footballers
Germany international footballers
1. FC Kaiserslautern players
FK Pirmasens players
People from Pirmasens
Footballers from Rhineland-Palatinate